Elvira Rinatovna Aitkulova (born 19 August 1973) is a Russian journalist and politician from United Russia. She has represented Beloretsk constituency in the State Duma since 2021.

Education 
She graduated from Bashkir State University.

Activity 
In 1997-2004 she worked as a political observer for the State Television and Radio Broadcasting Company "Bashkortostan", affiliated with VGTRK. In 2010-2013, he was the editor-in-chief of the "Bashkortostan" TV studio.

In 2013, she was elected a deputy of the 5th State Assembly of Bashkortostan, chairman of the committee on education, culture, sports and youth policy. In 2018, she was reelected to the sixth convocation. Member of the United Russia faction. Deputy Chairman of the State Assembly (2018). Aitkulova also was co-chair of the regional headquarters of the All-Russia People's Front.

In 2019 Aitkulova was elected Chairperson of the Presidium of The World Qoroltai of the Bashkirs.

References 

Living people
1973 births
Eighth convocation members of the State Duma (Russian Federation)
People from Bashkortostan
United Russia politicians
21st-century Russian women politicians
Bashkir State University alumni